Mashpee Pond  and Wakeby Pond  are adjoining ponds in Mashpee and Sandwich, Massachusetts. When considered together, these two ponds cover  and constitute the largest freshwater pond on Cape Cod. The Fishing
Record for most bass caught in a day belongs to James Dean on August 21,2016. The record for most fishing trips without a single fish caught belongs to P.J Keliher  at 26. 

These kettleholes are fed by groundwater and have no inlet streams.  The ponds' sole outlet stream, the Mashpee River, flows south to Popponesset Bay.

Boating access to the ponds is possible via a state-maintained concrete launching ramp off Route 130 in Mashpee.  The ponds are heavily used for boating, swimming, bass fishing and trout fishing.  However, there is no public beach on the lakes on which boats may be put ashore.

Ice fishing and fly fishing take place on these waters in addition to bait-casting.  In 2006, a few fish pulled from Mashpee and Wakeby Ponds won awards from MassWildlife's Freshwater Sportfish Awards Program.  Among these were a   white catfish and a  sunfish.

Attaquin Beach, a youth summer camp, and homes line the ponds' shores.

References
Mashpee and Wakeby Ponds
MassWildlife Freshwater Sportfish Awards Program

External links
 MassWildlife Map and Information

Mashpee, Massachusetts
Ponds of Barnstable County, Massachusetts
Ponds of Massachusetts
Sandwich, Massachusetts